The 2000–2001 FINA Swimming World Cup was a series of ten international short course (25m) swimming meets organized by FINA. The meets were held in ten different cities, from November 2000 through January 2001. Each featured 34 events: seventeen for males and seventeen for females.

Meets
Dates and locations for the 2000–2001 World Cup meets were:

Event winners

50 freestyle
 Men Winner: N/A
 Women Winner:  Martina Moravcová

100 freestyle
 Men Winner:  Brian Jones
 Women Winner:  Martina Moravcová

200 freestyle
 Men Winner: N/A
 Women Winner:  Martina Moravcová

400 freestyle
 Men Winner: N/A
 Women Winner: N/A

1500/800 freestyle
 Men Winner: N/A
 Women Winner: N/A

50 Backstroke
 Men Winner:  Sebastian Halgasch 
 Women Winner:  Martina Moravcová

100 Backstroke
 Men Winner:  Gordan Kozulj  
 Women Winner: N/A

200 Backstroke
 Men Winner:  Gordan Kozulj  
 Women Winner: N/A

50 Breaststroke
 Men Winner:  Morgan Knabe  
 Women Winner:  Sylvia Gerasch

100 Breaststroke
 Men Winner:  Morgan Knabe  
 Women Winner:  Amy Balcerzak

200 Breaststroke
 Men Winner:  Fabio Farabegoli   
 Women Winner:  Amy Balcerzak

50 Butterfly
 Men Winner:  Michael Mintenko  
 Women Winner:  Martina Moravcová

100 Butterfly
 Men Winner:  Michael Mintenko  
 Women Winner:  Martina Moravcová

200 Butterfly
 Men Winner:  Denis Pankratov  
 Women Winner: N/A

100 Individual Medley
 Men Winner:  Jirka Letzin 
 Women Winner:  Martina Moravcová

200 Individual Medley
 Men Winner:  Jirka Letzin 
 Women Winner:  Amy Balcerzak

400 Individual Medley
 Men Winner:  Jirka Letzin 
 Women Winner: N/A

References

FINA Swimming World Cup